The Episcopal Diocese of North Carolina is a diocese of the Episcopal Church within Province IV that encompasses central North Carolina. Founded in 1817, the modern boundaries of the diocese roughly correspond to the portion of North Carolina between I-77 in the west and I-95 in the east, including the most populous area of the state. Raleigh, Charlotte, Winston-Salem, Greensboro, and Durham are the largest cities in the diocese. The diocese originally covered the entirety of the state, until the Diocese of East Carolina which stretches to the Atlantic was formed in 1883, and the Diocese of Western North Carolina which lies to the west extending into the Appalachian Mountains was formed in 1922.

About the Diocese
The diocese has no cathedral, but its offices are located in the state capital of Raleigh. Representatives of the dioceses' 109 parishes meet annually at a diocesan convention in November. Between conventions, the diocese is administered by a Diocesan Council in conjunction with the diocesan staff who work under the bishop.

The current diocesan bishop is Samuel Sewall Rodman III. He was consecrated bishop on July 15, 2017, as the twelfth bishop of the Diocese of North Carolina, after the election of his predecessor, Michael Bruce Curry, as Presiding Bishop of the Episcopal Church. The assistant bishop of the diocese is Jennifer Brooke-Davidson. The bishop suffragan of the diocese, Anne Hodges-Copple, retired in December 2022.

Other bishops who have served the diocese since 1980 are the late Robert W. Estill (ninth bishop of the diocese), the late Robert C. Johnson (tenth bishop of the diocese), the late Frank Vest (suffragan bishop of the diocese who subsequently became bishop of the Episcopal Diocese of Southern Virginia), the late Huntington Williams, Jr. (retired suffragan bishop), J. Gary Gloster (retired suffragan bishop), William Gregg (retired assistant bishop and previously the bishop of the Episcopal Diocese of Eastern Oregon), the late Alfred C. Marble, Jr. (retired assisting bishop and previously the bishop of the Episcopal Diocese of Mississippi), and the late Peter James Lee (formerly provisional bishop of the Episcopal Diocese of East Carolina and bishop of the Episcopal Diocese of Virginia).

Congregations in the diocese vary from conservative to liberal and from low church to high church, but the diocese itself is generally considered moderate and is highly supportive of the Episcopal Church. Consisting of approximately 48,000 communicants, the diocese is the tenth-largest in the nation and has shown a 3% compound annual growth rate over the last ten years. The density of Episcopalians varies across the diocese but is highest in Wake County, the county of the state capital, Raleigh.

Programs and institutions

Principal programs of the diocese include campus ministries and social ministries:

 Campus ministry (at North Carolina State University, St. Augustine's University, Duke University, Elon University, the University of North Carolina at Chapel Hill, the University of North Carolina at Greensboro, the University of North Carolina at Charlotte, Wake Forest University, and Davidson College). In 2019, the diocesan programming extended to digital ministry with the launch of a smartphone app for young adults titled YEAH: Young Episcopal Adult Hub.
 Social ministry, notably the Episcopal Farmworkers Ministry in Newton Grove, a joint venture with the Diocese of East Carolina. In a state with a growing Latino population, the diocese supports a Chartered Committee on Hispanic Ministry. The committee provides liturgical and pastoral resources, supports congregations' service and outreach among Latinas and Latinos, and advocates for immigration reform and other laws to protect the rights of migrant workers.

The diocese no longer operates a camp and conference center, having sold its facility near Browns Summit, North Carolina to the State of North Carolina for use as Haw River State Park. However, the diocese maintains an active youth program. The territory of the diocese includes independent schools with current or former diocesan affiliations including Trinity Episcopal School and Palisades Episcopal School in Charlotte, Canterbury School in Greensboro, and St. Mary's School and Ravenscroft School in Raleigh.

Other major institutions affiliated with the diocese are Penick Village in Southern Pines, a retirement community; and Thompson Child and Family Focus in Charlotte, a youth services ministry.

Bishops

Notes

References

Further reading

External links

Website of the Diocesan Committee on Hispanic Ministry
Journal of the Conventions of the Protestant Episcopal Church in the Diocese of North Carolina a complete listing of diocesan conventions from 1817-1923, 1926-2003, 2010–12

North Carolina
Religious organizations established in 1817
Diocese of North Carolina
Anglican dioceses established in the 19th century
1817 establishments in North Carolina
Province 4 of the Episcopal Church (United States)